State Road 540 (NM 540) is a  state highway in the US state of New Mexico. NM 540's western terminus is at the end of state maintenance west of Logan, and the eastern terminus is at U.S. Route 54 (US 54) in Logan.

Major intersections

See also

References

540
Transportation in Quay County, New Mexico